is a Japanese footballer currently playing as a forward for Fukushima United.

Career statistics

Club
.

Notes

References

2002 births
Living people
Sportspeople from Kitakyushu
Association football people from Fukuoka Prefecture
Japanese footballers
Association football forwards
J3 League players
Fukushima United FC players